F.T.T.W. is the title of the third album released by H2O. It was released on May 18, 1999. It was their second of two albums to be released on Epitaph Records before they moved to MCA Records.

The final track includes a hidden track, "Not Just Boys Fun", which is a 7 Seconds cover.

The band shot a video for the song "One Life, One Chance".

Track listing
All songs by H2O unless otherwise noted.
 "Faster Than the World" – 2:17
 "Empty Pockets" – 1:13
 "One Life, One Chance" – 1:55
 "Guilty by Association" – 2:24
 "Fading" – 1:53
 "Bootstraps" – 1:00
 "Can I Overcome?" – 1:27
 "Found the Truth Within" – 1:52
 "Old School Recess" – 1:06
 "Helpless Not Hopeless" – 2:36
 "On Your Feet" – 1:41
 "Day by Day" – 1:30
 "Force Field" – 1:55
 "Ez.2.B. Anti" – 2:14
 "M & M" – 2:01
 "Reputation Calls" – 1:16
 "Liberate" – 2:21
 "Follow the Three Way" – 3:48
Contains the hidden track "Not Just Boys Fun" (7 Seconds)

Personnel
 Toby Morse – vocals
 Todd Morse – guitar, vocals
 Rusty Pistachio – guitar, vocals
 Adam Blake – bass
 Todd Friend – drums, vocals
 Dicky Barrett – vocals on "Faster Than the World" and "Force Field"
 Tim Armstrong – vocals on "Faster Than the World"
 Roger Miret – vocals on "Faster Than the World"
 Ryunosuke – vocals on "Faster Than the World"
 Freddy Cricien – vocals on "Guilty by Association"
 Anthony Civarelli – vocals on "EZ. 2. B. Anti"
 Denise Miret – vocals on "Not Just Boys Fun"
 Melissa Corales – vocals on "Not Just Boys Fun"
 Wendy Schnaars – vocals on "Not Just Boys Fun"
 Under the Gun – vocals on "Not Just Boys Fun"
Engineered by Michael Caiati

References

H2O (American band) albums
1999 albums
Epitaph Records albums